Chrysozephyrus syla, the silver hairstreak, is a small butterfly found in India that belongs to the lycaenids or blues family.

Taxonomy
The butterfly was previously classified as Thecla syla Kollar.

Range
The butterfly occurs in Afghanistan, Pakistan and north west India - from Safed Koh, Chitral to Kumaon and from Sikkim to Manipur.

Status
In 1932 William Harry Evans described the species as rare.

See also
List of butterflies of India (Lycaenidae)

Cited references

References
  
 
 

Chrysozephyrus
Butterflies of Asia
Butterflies described in 1848